First Star Software, Inc. was a Chappaqua, New York based video game development, publishing and licensing company, founded by Richard Spitalny (who remains the company's president), Billy Blake, Peter Jablon, and Fernando Herrera in 1982. It is best known for the series Boulder Dash, which began on the Atari 8-bit family, and Spy vs. Spy, which first appeared on the Commodore 64. Games were ported to or written for home computers, consoles, and later for Macintosh, Microsoft Windows, and portable devices. Millions of units have been sold in both the Boulder Dash and Spy vs. Spy series of games.

As of January 1, 2018 the First Star Software name and website are owned by BBG Entertainment GmbH which also purchased all intellectual property rights pertaining to Astro Chase, BOiNG!, Boulder Dash, Bristles, Flip & Flop, Millennium Warriors, Omnicron Conspiracy, Panic Button, Rent Wars and Security Alert.

History
Fernando Herrera wrote an educational program for the Atari 8-bit family, My First Alphabet, which was published by the Atari Program Exchange in 1981. That same year, Atari, Inc., created an award to honor the year's best APX submission. The first Atari Star went to My First Alphabet along with a $25,000 prize. Herrera partnered with Richard Spitalny, Billy Blake, and Peter Jablon to found First Star Software. His story of winning the Atari Star made him the face of the company.

First Star's inaugural release was the Atari 8-bit computer shoot 'em up Astro Chase, which was later distributed by Parker Brothers. Herrera also wrote Bristles and Superman: The Game for First Star.

First Star's two biggest titles came from outside developers, Boulder Dash and Spy vs. Spy, each of which was the first game in a series.

Games
Astro Chase
Boing! (Atari 2600)
Boulder Dash
Bristles
Flip & Flop
Millennium Warriors
Omnicron Conspiracy
Panic Button
Rent Wars
Security Alert
Spy vs. Spy
Superman: The Game
Superman: The Man of Steel
U.S. Adventure

References

External links
Fernando Herrera Interview from 2014

Video game companies of the United States
Video game development companies